Vehicles powered by MTU engines

Trains and locomotives
Diesel engines were built in the 1960s under the Maybach name, later engines were built under the MTU name.
Bombardier Talent and Turbostar DMUs
Brookville BL20G and BL20GH locomotives
Brookville BL36PH locomotive
DB Class V 160 (Maybach)
IE 22000 Class
SNCF Class BB 75000 and SNCF Class BB 69400
NS DE 6400
Bombardier Traxx diesel
Siemens Eurorunner and Asiarunner
Korail Diesel Hydraulic Car by "Saemaul" Train
Voith Gravita Locomotive family
New Zealand DL class locomotive
NIR Class 4000
South African Class 45-000, one MTU 20V 4000 R63L engine
Krauss-Maffei ML 4000, two Maybach MD870 engines
Sri Lanka Railways S8 DMUs
Sri Lanka Railways S9 DMUs
Sri Lanka Railways S10 DMUs
Sri Lanka Railways S12 DMUs
Stadler GTW DMUs
Pesa Link DMUs
CAF Bitrac
Vossloh G6

United Kingdom
Class 35, Maybach MD870 engine built under licence in UK by Bristol Siddeley
Class 42, two Maybach MD650 engines built under licence in UK by Bristol Siddeley
Class 52, two Maybach MD655 engines
Class 73/9, one MTU 8V 4000 R43L engine
Class 168, Class 170 and Class 171: MTU 6R 183TD series (one per car)
Class 172: MTU 6H1800R83 (one per car)
Class 195 and Class 196: MTU 6H1800R85L (one per car)
Class 43s: MTU 16V4000 R41R widely installed in early 2000s, replacing original Paxman Valenta engines.
The MTU 12V 1600 R80L for the Class 800 and Class 802 (three per five car set and five per nine car set)
The Eurailscout UFM160 Track Recording Train (DB999700/701) was powered by MTU Diesel Engines, coupled to Voith Transmission and ZF Final Drive units

Vehicles

 Haul trucks
 Belaz 75600
 Agricultural tractors
 Deutz-Fahr 11-series tractor

Military vehicles

Armoured fighting vehicles
Tanks
Indian Arjun tank (The engine is license produced in India)
Israeli Merkava tank (The engine is license produced in the USA)
Kanonenjagdpanzer, Raketenjagdpanzer 2, Jaguar 1, Jaguar 2 tank destroyers
Korean K1 88-Tank
Leopard 1 and Leopard 2 tanks
TAM Tanque Argentino Mediano
Heavy off-road truck
Tatra T815
Self-propelled artillery
Flugabwehrkanonenpanzer Gepard anti-aircraft gun
PzH 2000 and Palmaria 155mm howitzers
Korean K-9 155mm howitzer
Infantry fighting vehicles
Marder
M113 (upgraded)
Piranha II
ASCOD (Pizarro/Ulan)
EFV (Expeditionary Fighting Vehicle)

Marine applications

Ships
Yachts
Rising Sun
Indian Empress
Octopus
Deva
No. 1
Predator
Sunrays
Sunseeker
Azimut Yachts
Ferries
BatamFast Ferry Pte. Ltd.
Sindo Ferry Pte. Ltd.
Hawaii Superferry
Sydney Ferries

Majestic Fast Ferries
Bintan Resort Ferries
Fireboats
Three Forty Three
Fire Fighter II
Frigates and corvettes

s
s
s
s
Vosper Thornycroft MK9 corvettes
Some s
 s (copy)
s
s
s
s
Many other MEKO type frigates and corvettes
Small combatants
s
s

s
s

Mine warfare ships
s
s
s
s
Submarines
s
Type 206 submarines
Type 209 submarines
s
s
Type 212 submarines
Type 214 submarines

References